Live at The N.E.C. was the second live album by rock band Status Quo which was recorded at the National Exhibition Centre. It had originally been released as part of the 3-LP box set From the Makers of... in 1982. In 1984 the recording became available as a separate album.

Track listings
"Caroline" (Rossi, Young)
"Roll Over Lay Down" (Rossi, Young, Parfitt, Lancaster, Coghlan)
"Backwater" (Parfitt, Lancaster)
"Little Lady" (Parfitt)
"Don't Drive My Car" (Parfitt, Bown)
"Whatever You Want" (Parfitt, Bown)
"Hold You Back" (Rossi, Young, Parfitt)
"Rockin' All Over the World" (John Fogerty)
"Over the Edge" (Lancaster, Keith Lamb)
"Don't Waste My Time" (Rossi, Young)

2006 reissue bonus tracks
"Dirty Water" (Rossi, Young)
"Down Down" (Rossi, Young)

2017 Deluxe Edition
Disc 1
"Caroline" (Rossi, Young)
"Roll Over Lay Down" (Rossi, Young, Parfitt, Lancaster, Coghlan)
"Backwater" (Parfitt, Lancaster)
"Little Lady" (Parfitt)
"Don't Drive My Car" (Parfitt, Bown)
"Whatever You Want" (Parfitt, Bown)
"Hold You Back" (Rossi, Young, Parfitt)
"Rockin' All Over the World" (John Fogerty)
"Over the Edge" (Lancaster, Keith Lamb)
"Don't Waste My Time" (Rossi, Young)
"Dirty Water" (Rossi, Young)

Disc 2
"Forty-Five Hundred Times" (Rossi, Parfitt)
"Big Fat Mama" (Rossi, Parfitt)
 "Roadhouse Blues" (Jim Morrison, John Densmore, Robby Krieger, Ray Manzarek)
"Rain" (Parfitt)
"Down Down" (Rossi, Young)
"Bye Bye Johnny"  (Chuck Berry)

In 2010 the complete concert was released for the first time in a 7CD+1DVD collection called Live At The BBC.

Personnel
Status Quo
Francis Rossi - vocals, lead guitar
Rick Parfitt - vocals, guitar
Alan Lancaster - bass, vocals
Andy Bown - keyboards, vocals
Pete Kircher - drums

One single was released from Live at the N.E.C. in 1982: "Caroline" b/w "Dirty Water" on 7" Vertigo QUO 10 (6059583) and 7"-picture disc Vertigo QUO P10 - furthermore a 12"-single (Vertigo QUO 1012) featured "Down Down" as the b-side's second track.

Charts

References

Status Quo (band) live albums
1984 live albums
Vertigo Records live albums